Suzanne King (born May 12, 1964) is an American cross-country skier. She competed at the 1994 Winter Olympics in Lillehammer and the 1998 Winter Olympics in Nagano.

Cross-country skiing results
All results are sourced from the International Ski Federation (FIS).

Olympic Games

World Championships

World Cup

Season standings

References

External links
 

1964 births
Living people
American female cross-country skiers
Olympic cross-country skiers of the United States
Cross-country skiers at the 1994 Winter Olympics
Cross-country skiers at the 1998 Winter Olympics
Sportspeople from New Haven, Connecticut
21st-century American women